The canton of Nogent-sur-Oise is an administrative division of the Oise department, northern France. It was created at the French canton reorganisation which came into effect in March 2015. Its seat is in Nogent-sur-Oise.

It consists of the following communes:
Cauffry
Laigneville
Mogneville
Monchy-Saint-Éloi
Nogent-sur-Oise
Villers-Saint-Paul

References

Cantons of Oise